Yankee Stadium can refer to:

 Yankee Stadium, the New York Yankees' current ballpark, opened in 2009
 Yankee Stadium (1923), the New York Yankees' former ballpark, opened in 1923
 161st Street – Yankee Stadium (New York City Subway), the subway station complex consisting of:
161st Street – Yankee Stadium (IRT Jerome Avenue Line), serving the  train
161st Street – Yankee Stadium (IND Concourse Line), serving the  trains
 Yankees – East 153rd Street (Metro-North station) on the Hudson line
 Yankee Stadium Legacy, the baseball card compilation